Nancy Kedersha (born 1951) is an American cell biologist and micrographer. She got her Ph.D. from Rutgers University where she worked in Richard Berg's lab studying the characteristics and assembly of prolyl hydroxylases. Afterwards she joined Leonard Rome's lab at UCLA as a post-doctoral fellow where she co-discovered the vault (organelle). Subsequently, she worked at ImmunoGen Inc. where she worked on staining and photographing different cancer cells. Currently, she works as an instructor of medicine at Brigham and Women's Hospital in Paul Anderson's lab where her work focuses on studying stress granules formation. In addition to her contributions as a scientist, Kedersha has been quite successful in different microscopy competitions. She is a four-time Nikon Small World finalist and in 2011 she won the Lennart Nilsson Award.

Education and early life 
Kedersha is the daughter of Richard Kedersha, a professor of business administration and basketball coach at Rutgers University. She graduated high school from Rutherford High School in the class of 1969. After completing her bachelor's in biology from Bucknell University in 1973, Kedersha pursued her graduate studies at Rutgers University in Richard Berg's lab where she characterized the purification, assembly, and biosynthesis of prolyl hydroxylase. In 1983 she obtained her PhD in biochemistry.

Career 
From 1983 to 1988 Kedersha worked as a post doctoral fellow in Leonard Rome's lab at UCLA. In collaboration with Rome, she co-discovered the vault (organelle). The vault is this large cytoplasmic organelle found in eukaryotes, but whose function has not fully been elucidated. Recent studies done in trypanosome suggest it plays a role in trans-spliced mRNA.

After her post-doctoral fellowship, Kedersha worked briefly in industry for ImmunoGen Inc. using microscopy to study cancer cells. She returned to academia where she is currently working as an instructor of medicine within Paul Anderson's lab at Brigham and Women's Hospital where she studies stress granules. While there, she became the director of the confocal microscopy core. She also co-wrote a chapter in Translation Mechanisms and Control.

Awards and honors 
Kedersha has placed ten times in the Nikon Small World competition in which four of those times she was a finalist. She has also won the prestigious Lennart Nilsson Award in 2011 for her work in fluorescence microscopy.

References 

1951 births
Living people
Rutgers University alumni
University of California, Los Angeles alumni
Bucknell University alumni
Cell biologists
People from Hackensack, New Jersey
People from Rutherford, New Jersey
Rutherford High School (New Jersey) alumni